Robert "Bob" Murphy (born 9 June 1982) is a former professional Australian rules footballer who played for the Western Bulldogs in the Australian Football League (AFL). Renowned for his silky skills and leadership qualities, Murphy also proved a versatile player, equally capable of playing in attack or in defence depending on the situation. He was appointed as the Bulldogs' captain for 2015 following the departure of predecessor Ryan Griffen.

Early life
Murphy is the third and youngest child of John and Monica Murphy. Both parents belonged formerly to Catholic orders, John as a priest and Monica as a nun. He has one brother, Ben, and a sister, Bridget.

AFL career
Murphy was drafted to the Western Bulldogs with pick 13 in the 1999 National Draft. After spending much of the 2000 season developing his slim frame, he made his debut in Round 19 against Carlton at Princes Park, gathering 13 disposals and kicking a goal in a thrilling 3-point victory. In 2001 he was nominated for the AFL Rising Star award in round 16 after playing .

In 2005, under new coach Rodney Eade, Murphy cemented a place as a small centre half forward. He kicked 33 goals from this position and his overhead marking and leading ability were invaluable to the team. As part of the leadership group he led his younger teammates by great example across the half forward line.

On 26 May 2006 Murphy injured his left knee during a horrible collision in the Bulldogs' 34-point loss to Collingwood. This injury caused him to miss the remainder of the 2006 season, including what would have been his first finals series. After successful reconstruction, he returned to action in the 2007 NAB Cup series in February 2007. He injured his right knee early in the 2008 season, but played on for the remainder of the season, before undergoing surgery to repair a damaged patellar tendon in September 2008.

Murphy was back to form resembling his best in 2010, when he posted his second top-five finish in the club best and fairest. He spent more time across half-back, where his disposal and decision-making were up to his usual high standard. In games against Essendon and Fremantle he collected a career-best 28 disposals. He missed three games mid-year with a knee injury which was again aggravated in the preliminary final, requiring post-season surgery.

In 2011 he had one of his best ever seasons, finishing second in the Bulldogs' best and fairest award, and earning his first selection in an All-Australian team, being named on a half-back flank.

In 2015 he was named captain of the year at the AFLPA awards becoming the fourth player to win the award in his first year as a captain and was also named captain of the all Australian team becoming the first ever player to have collected both honours in the same season.

On 10 April 2016, in the final minutes of the Bulldogs three-point loss to Hawthorn, Murphy sustained a knee injury while contesting a mark in the Hawks' forward 50. Scans later revealed he had injured his knee and had sustained a season-ending ruptured anterior cruciate ligament. Murphy later confirmed that he would play on for the Dogs in the 2017 season, and he ultimately missed the club's premiership win in October of 2016. Easton Wood was named as his replacement as captain. Robert Murphy played the final game of his career in round 23 2017, where he collected 15 disposals and 1 goal in a 9-point loss to Hawthorn.

Statistics

|-
|- style="background-color: #EAEAEA"
! scope="row" style="text-align:center" | 2000
|
| 22 || 3 || 1 || 0 || 13 || 7 || 20 || 4 || 1 || 0.3 || 0.0 || 4.3 || 2.3 || 6.7 || 1.3 || 0.3
|-
! scope="row" style="text-align:center" | 2001
|
| 2 || 16 || 2 || 0 || 105 || 60 || 165 || 45 || 16 || 0.1 || 0.0 || 6.6 || 3.8 || 10.3 || 2.8 || 1.0
|- style="background-color: #EAEAEA"
! scope="row" style="text-align:center" | 2002
|
| 2 || 19 || 5 || 6 || 196 || 94 || 290 || 93 || 27 || 0.3 || 0.3 || 10.3 || 4.9 || 15.3 || 4.9 || 1.4
|-
! scope="row" style="text-align:center" | 2003
|
| 2 || 22 || 5 || 3 || 273 || 101 || 374 || 98 || 31 || 0.2 || 0.1 || 12.4 || 4.6 || 17.0 || 4.5 || 1.4
|- style="background-color: #EAEAEA"
! scope="row" style="text-align:center" | 2004
|
| 2 || 19 || 16 || 8 || 218 || 69 || 287 || 85 || 40 || 0.8 || 0.4 || 11.5 || 3.6 || 15.1 || 4.5 || 2.1
|-
! scope="row" style="text-align:center" | 2005
|
| 2 || 22 || 33 || 19 || 284 || 77 || 361 || 172 || 26 || 1.5 || 0.9 || 12.9 || 3.5 || 16.4 || 7.8 || 1.2
|- style="background-color: #EAEAEA"
! scope="row" style="text-align:center" | 2006
|
| 2 || 9 || 13 || 12 || 97 || 22 || 119 || 70 || 11 || 1.4 || 1.3 || 10.8 || 2.4 || 13.2 || 7.8 || 1.2
|-
! scope="row" style="text-align:center" | 2007
|
| 2 || 17 || 19 || 13 || 188 || 45 || 233 || 110 || 23 || 1.1 || 0.8 || 11.1 || 2.6 || 13.7 || 6.5 || 1.4
|- style="background-color: #EAEAEA"
! scope="row" style="text-align:center" | 2008
|
| 2 || 24 || 34 || 18 || 321 || 108 || 429 || 209 || 42 || 1.4 || 0.8 || 13.4 || 4.5 || 17.9 || 8.7 || 1.8
|-
! scope="row" style="text-align:center" | 2009
|
| 2 || 16 || 10 || 15 || 186 || 85 || 271 || 128 || 20 || 0.6 || 0.9 || 11.6 || 5.3 || 16.9 || 8.0 || 1.3
|- style="background-color: #EAEAEA"
! scope="row" style="text-align:center" | 2010
|
| 2 || 21 || 8 || 7 || 281 || 122 || 403 || 135 || 22 || 0.4 || 0.3 || 13.4 || 5.8 || 19.2 || 6.4 || 1.0
|-
! scope="row" style="text-align:center" | 2011
|
| 2 || 21 || 6 || 4 || 306 || 128 || 434 || 77 || 36 || 0.3 || 0.2 || 14.6 || 6.1 || 20.7 || 3.7 || 1.7
|- style="background-color: #EAEAEA"
! scope="row" style="text-align:center" | 2012
|
| 2 || 21 || 2 || 0 || 295 || 125 || 420 || 78 || 33 || 0.1 || 0.0 || 14.0 || 6.0 || 20.0 || 3.7 || 1.6
|-
! scope="row" style="text-align:center" | 2013
|
| 2 || 19 || 13 || 7 || 296 || 122 || 418 || 88 || 43 || 0.7 || 0.4 || 15.6 || 6.4 || 22.0 || 4.6 || 2.3
|- style="background-color: #EAEAEA"
! scope="row" style="text-align:center" | 2014
|
| 2 || 22 || 4 || 5 || 294 || 158 || 452 || 91 || 39 || 0.2 || 0.2 || 13.4 || 7.2 || 20.5 || 4.1 || 1.8
|-
! scope="row" style="text-align:center" | 2015
|
| 2 || 21 || 2 || 2 || 324 || 147 || 471 || 96 || 32 || 0.1 || 0.1 || 15.4 || 7.0 || 22.4 || 4.6 || 1.5
|- style="background-color: #EAEAEA"
! scope="row" style="text-align:center" | 2016
|
| 2 || 3 || 0 || 1 || 55 || 29 || 84 || 19 || 6 || 0.0 || 0.3 || 18.3 || 9.7 || 28.0 || 6.3 || 2.0
|-
! scope="row" style="text-align:center" | 2017
|
| 2 || 17 || 10 || 7 || 208 || 128 || 336 || 84 || 36 || 0.6 || 0.4 || 12.2 || 7.5 || 19.8 || 4.9 || 2.1
|- class="sortbottom"
! colspan=3| Career
! 312
! 183
! 127
! 3940
! 1627
! 5567
! 1682
! 484
! 0.6
! 0.4
! 12.6
! 5.2
! 17.8
! 5.4
! 1.6
|}

Personal life
He is married to wife Justine, and has three children – a son, and two daughters.

Media work

Murphy features frequently in the media. He writes a weekly column in the sport section of The Age newspaper. An article he wrote about playing against Steve Johnson earned him a highly commended prize in the 2012 Australian Football Media Association awards.

He was formerly a regular panelist on the AFL 360 television talk show on Fox Footy. In 2018 in collaboration with Fox Footy he released his own short weekly series called 'Bob,' where he interviewed a number of Australian icons. Murphy formerly hosted the Western Bulldogs' podcast "Freedom in a Cage" along with retired basketball player Chris Anstey, and also co-hosted the Official Bulldogs podcast 'Barkly Street' alongside captain of the Western Bulldogs, Marcus Bontempelli.

In mid 2019, Murphy joined Andy Maher to host the late afternoon drive show on 1116 SEN radio. In September 2021, it was announced that Murphy would leave his Melbourne based media roles and move to Perth to become Fremantle Football Club's Head of Football Operations and Performance.

References

External links

1982 births
Living people
Australian rules footballers from Victoria (Australia)
Western Bulldogs players
Gippsland Power players
Warragul Football Club players
All-Australians (AFL)
Australia international rules football team players
Fremantle Football Club administrators